Berrigan Shire is a local government area in the southern Riverina region of New South Wales, Australia. The Shire lies on the New South Wales State border with Victoria formed by the Murray River. The Shire is adjacent to the Newell and Riverina Highways. The Shire is a mainly agricultural region, with dairying, cattle raising, woolgrowing and cropping the main activities.  The vast majority of the Shire is irrigated.  Tourism is another major activity, concentrated on the river towns of Tocumwal and Barooga.

The mayor of Berrigan Shire is Cr. Matt Hannan, an unaligned politician.

Towns and localities
Towns in the shire are:

 Berrigan, where the Council office is based
 Finley
 Tocumwal, and
 Barooga.

Demographics

Proposed amalgamation
The Jerilderie Shire Council submitted an alternate proposal to the Minister for Local Government that the entire Jerilderie Shire amalgamate with the Murrumbidgee Shire.

The NSW Government decided in May 2016 not to proceed with the proposed amalgamation.

Council

Current composition and election method
Berrigan Shire Council is composed of eight councillors elected proportionally as a single ward. All councillors are elected for a fixed four-year term of office. The mayor is elected by the councillors at the first meeting of the council. The most recent election was held on 4 December 2021, and the makeup of the council is as follows:

The current Council, elected in 2021, in order of election, is:

References

External links

Berrigan Shire Council website

Local government areas of the Riverina
Newell Highway